Jackpot is a 1993 Malayalam-language film, directed by Jomon.It stars Mammootty, Tejas Kapadia, Aishwarya and Gautami, with Kannada actor R. N. Sudarshan playing the antagonist. It portrays the story of a race jockey.

Summary
Gowtham Krishna (Mammootty) and Sindhu (Aishwarya) get married opposing her rich parents' disapproval. Sindhu ( Aishwarya ) dies after giving birth to their son Rahul (Tejas Kapadia). The rich parents of Sindhu (Aishwarya) take custody of the child and Gowtham Krishna (Mammootty) is left with the only option of winning a horse race to get back the custody of his child.

Cast

Mammootty as Gowtham Krishna
Aishwarya as Sindhu
Gautami as Amirtha
Jagadish as David
R. N. Sudarshan as Venkatesh
Jagannadha Varma as DSP
 Tejas Kapadia as Rahul (Gowtham's Son)
Sainudeen
Rajan P. Dev Gounder
Prathapachandran Ruby Devaraj
Vijayakumar
Bahadoor as Moiduikka
Devan as Jayan
Kollam Ajith
M. G. Soman as Sundaram
Mala Aravindan as Doctor 
Manjula Vijayakumar as Rakhee Varma	
Poornam Viswanathan
T. P. Madhavan
Gavin Packard
Nishal Chandra
P. K. Abraham as School Principal

Soundtrack 

The soundtrack was composed by Ilaiyaraaja, with lyrics written by Bichu Thirumala.

References

External links

1993 films
1990s Malayalam-language films
Films scored by Ilaiyaraaja